Baozhong may refer to:

 Baozhong tea, a kind of tea
 Baozhong, Yunlin, a rural township in Yunlin County, Taiwan